The feudal barony of Bar was a feudal barony with its caput baronium at an unknown location in North Kintyre, Scotland. The MacDonalds of Dunnyveg held the barony in the 16th century.

References

Notes

Bibliography
Constable, T. and A.: Publications of the Scottish History Society (1920).

Feudalism in Scotland
Scottish society
Kintyre
Bar
Bar
Titles in Scotland
Lists of nobility
Scots law
Scotland